Jean-Paul Pecqueur is an American poet, critic, and professor. He is author of The Case Against Happiness (Alice James Books, 2006), winner of a New England/New York Award. Publishers Weekly, in praising The Case Against Happiness, wrote "...a promising poet with a generosity of spirit and the knowledge that 'joy is not impossible,'" and Library Journal wrote, "Sardonic and humorous, cynical and complex, these metaphysical musings celebrate the nameless dread, the logic of the illogical. They address big ideas: life, death, heaven, shoe shopping. They twist and loop, follow to unexpected conclusions...." Pecqueur has had his poems and reviews published in literary journals and magazines including American Letters & Commentary, The Hat, ZYZZYVA,  and Rain Taxi.

Pecqueur is from Tacoma, Washington, and earned his B.A. in interdisciplinary studies and his M.F.A. in creative writing from the University of Washington. He teaches at the Pratt Institute, York College, and the City University of New York, and he lives in New York. His honors include the Academy of American Poets Harold Taylor Prize. He is also a member of the Alice James Books Cooperative Board.

References

External links 
 Review: Bookslut > June 2007 > Review by Jason B. Jones of The Case Against Happiness by Jean-Paul Pecqueur
 Interview: Kicking Wind > Every Other Day > January 21, 2007 > Interview with Jean-Paul Pecqueur
 Interview: Alice James Books > Jean-Paul Pecqueur Author Page > Interview with Jean-Paul Pecqueur
 Video: www.youtube.com > Jean-Paul Pecqueur Reading His Poetry
 Poems: La Fovea > Queens Country Public Library and Not Only in Music by Jean-Paul Pecqueur
 Poems: Contemporary Poetry > Language Is a Glorious Word and Howell St. Apts.  by Jean-Paul Pecqueur

American male poets
Living people
Poets from New York (state)
Writers from Tacoma, Washington
University of Washington alumni
Pratt Institute faculty
City University of New York faculty
Poets from Washington (state)
Year of birth missing (living people)